Petra Urbankova (born 26 October 1991) is a Czech track and field sprinter who competes in the 100 metres and 200 metres. Urbánková was runner-up at the 100 metres at the Czech Athletics Championships in 2014.

References 

Living people
Czech female sprinters
1991 births